Blake Signal (born 17 January 1982) is a New Zealand international lawn and indoor bowler.

Bowls career
Signal has won four New Zealand National Bowls Championships titles (the fours in 2010, 2012 and 2017 and pairs in 2012). Signal won a bronze medal at the 2016 World Outdoor Bowls Championship in Christchurch in the triples with Ali Forsyth and Mike Nagy before winning a gold medal in the fours with Forsyth, Nagy and Mike Kernaghan.

He was selected as part of the New Zealand team for the 2018 Commonwealth Games on the Gold Coast in Queensland.

References 

Profile at the New Zealand Olympic Committee website

1982 births
New Zealand male bowls players
Living people
Bowls World Champions
Bowls players at the 2014 Commonwealth Games
Bowls players at the 2018 Commonwealth Games
Commonwealth Games competitors for New Zealand
20th-century New Zealand people
21st-century New Zealand people